Myristica buchneriana is a species of plant in the family Myristicaceae. It is a tree endemic to New Guinea.

References

buchneriana
Endemic flora of New Guinea
Trees of New Guinea
Vulnerable plants
Taxonomy articles created by Polbot